Anna Kulinich-Sorokina (born 27 June 1992) is a visually impaired Paralympian athlete from Russia competing mainly in T12 classification and F12 classification sprint and javelin throw events. Kulinich-Sorokina represented Russia at the 2012 Summer Paralympics in London where she won a silver medal in the javelin throw. Eder has also won multiple medals at IPC World and European Championships including the 2013 World title in the javelin throw.

Notes

External links
 

1992 births
Russian female sprinters
Russian female javelin throwers
Paralympic athletes of Russia
Athletes (track and field) at the 2012 Summer Paralympics
Paralympic silver medalists for Russia
Living people
Medalists at the 2012 Summer Paralympics
People from Cheboksary
Paralympic medalists in athletics (track and field)
Athletes (track and field) at the 2020 Summer Paralympics
Paralympic bronze medalists for the Russian Paralympic Committee athletes
Sportspeople from Chuvashia
20th-century Russian women
21st-century Russian women